Koksilah is a community located just southeast of the City of Duncan, British Columbia, Canada.  Its name is derived, via that of the Koksilah River, from that of the Hwulqwselu people, one of the Hunqinum-speaking peoples of the area today organized as the Cowichan Tribes and government.

See also
Koksilah River Provincial Park

References

Populated places in the Cowichan Valley Regional District